This is the list of episodes for The Tonight Show with Conan O'Brien airing from June 1, 2009, to January 22, 2010.

2009

June

July

August

September

October

November

December

2010

January

See also
 List of The Tonight Show episodes

References

 Episode Guide
 Lineups

Episodes
Lists of American non-fiction television series episodes
Lists of variety television series episodes